Alexander von Humboldt was a German naturalist and explorer. 

Alexander von Humboldt or Alejandro de Humboldt may also refer to:

Ships
Alexander von Humboldt (ship), a German tall ship
Alexander von Humboldt II, German tall ship built 2011 as successor of the previous link
, a cruise ship operated by Phoenix Reisen 2005—2008
, formerly Crown Monarch, a cruise ship operated by Phoenix Reisen 2008 onwards, as of 2011 operated by the Turkish tour operator Bamtur
Alexander von Humboldt (dredging ship), a Belgian dredging vessel, an image of which can be viewed in the article on Dredging
CMA CGM Alexander von Humboldt, a containership

Sculptures
 Statue of Alexander von Humboldt (Begas), Germany
 Statue of Alexander von Humboldt (Stanford University), United States

Other
Alejandro de Humboldt National Park, Cuba
Alexander von Humboldt National Forest, a national forest in Peru
Alexander von Humboldt Foundation, a foundation promoting international cooperation in the field of scientific research